Women's Action Forum (WAF) is a women's rights organization in Pakistan.

History
Women's Action Forum (WAF) was established in Karachi in September, 1981 by a group of 15 women named Farida Sher, Samina Rehman, Najma Sadeque (1943- 2015) (Founder of Shirkat Gah), Rukhsana Rashid, Ghazala Rahman Rafiq, Farida Shaheed (head of NGO named Shirkat Gah), Fareeha Zafar, Aban Marker Kabraji, Zohra Yusuf (member Shirkat Gah), Nighat Said Khan (founder of Applied Socio-Economic Resource Center-ASR), Humaira Rehman, Sultanat Bokhari, Khawar Mumtaz, Hilda Saeed (member Shirkat Gah), Lala Rukh (1948 – 2017), Nigar Ahmed (1945 – 2017) and Nasreen Azhar, some of whom were associated with Lahore Grammar School, National College of Arts and NGOs like Simorgh, Society for Advancement of Education (SAHE) and Aurat Foundation. Other organisations which endorsed the charter of WAF included Democratic Women's Association, Tehrik-e-Niswan, Shirkat Gah, Pakistan Women Lawyers' Association, All Pakistan Women's Association and later on Sindhiani Tahreek.

The WAF was formed to respond to the implementation of the Hudood Ordinance penal code and to strengthen women's position in society generally. Women from civil society organizations in Karachi became the founding members of the WAF which has later been joined by chapters from Lahore (Punjab) and Islamabad (Capital of Pakistan) soon within a period of one year. In Karachi, Lahore, Islamabad, Hyderabad, Peshawar and Quetta the group agreed on collective leadership and formulated policy statements and engaged in political action to safeguard women's legal position.

Famous Members
Nigar Ahmed (1945 – 2017) started the Islamabad and Lahore chapters in 1982.
Amar Sindhu along with Arfana Mallah started chapter of Women's Action Forum (WAF) in Hyderabad in 2008. Since then they are actively working with WAF. Afiya Shehrbano Zia, famous feminist researcher is an active member of WAF, from Karachi.

External links
 ‘My years with WAF’ – Zohra Yusuf on the Pakistani women’s movement
 Women’s Action Forum
 Pakistan: A Country Study
 The Citizens Archive of Pakistan
 Women’s Action Forum

See also 
 All Pakistan Women's Association
 Aurat Foundation
 Tehrik-e-Niswan
 Democratic Women's Association
 Sindhiani Tahreek
 Shirkat Gah
 Pakistan Women Lawyers' Association
 Women Democratic Front
 Aurat March
 Feminism in Pakistan
 Women in Pakistan
 Women's rights
 National women's day (Pakistan)

References 

Women's organisations based in Pakistan
Organizations established in 1981